Water Resources Planning Organisation is an autonomous national organisation responsible for the implementation of water resource planning in Bangladesh and is located in Dhaka, Bangladesh.

History
The organisation was established in 1992. It traces it origins to Master Plan Organisation.

References

Research institutes in Bangladesh
Government agencies of Bangladesh
1992 establishments in Bangladesh
Organisations based in Dhaka
Water organizations
Water supply and sanitation in Bangladesh
Water management authorities in Bangladesh
Government agencies established in 1992
Research institutes established in 1992